Horishni Plavni (before 2016 known as Komsomolsk-na-Dnipri,  or simply Komsomolsk) is a purpose-built mining city in central Ukraine, located on the left bank of the Dnieper. Horishni Plavni is a city of regional significance of Poltava Oblast, practically conurbated with the larger neighboring city of Kremenchuk. Population:

Outline
Founded in 1960 as Komsomolsk-na-Dnipri, the city was purposely planned and built as the residential and civic area for the Poltava Mining and Extraction Combinat (now controlled by the Ferrexpo) - the most important iron ore-mining company in Ukraine. 80% of the city residents are employed by the mining industry. There are two gigantic open pit mines and several spoil tips on the city territory, to the north-east and south of the residential area.

The industry is served by several railway stations. However, the passenger service was discontinued and the city relies on intercity and suburban bus links. The combinat operates its own freight river port.

Due to the profitability of mining, small city of Horishni Plavni usually ranks high in all-Ukraine city rankings of birth rate, living standards, (un)employment and housing.

On 15 May 2015 President of Ukraine Petro Poroshenko signed a bill into law that started a six months period for the removal of communist monuments and the mandatory renaming of settlements with a name related to Communism. On 19 May 2016, Verkhovna Rada adopted decision to rename Komsomolsk as Horishni Plavni and conform to the law prohibiting names of Communist origin.

See also
Kostyantin Zhevago

References

External links

Ferrexpo corporate web site
Law of Ukraine "On the change of city boundaries for the city of Komsomolsk, Poltava Oblast" 

 
Cities in Poltava Oblast
Horishni Plavni
Populated places established in the Ukrainian Soviet Socialist Republic
Cities of regional significance in Ukraine
City name changes in Ukraine
Former Soviet toponymy in Ukraine
Populated places on the Dnieper in Ukraine